Nemesiidae, also known as funnel-web trapdoor spiders, is a family of mygalomorph spiders first described by Eugène Simon in 1889, and raised to family status in 1985. Before becoming its own family, it was considered part of "Dipluridae".

Description

Nemesiidae are relatively large spiders with robust legs and a body that is nearly three times as long as it is wide. They are darkly colored, brown to black, though some have silvery hairs on their carapace.

They live in burrows, often with a hinged trapdoor. This door is pushed up while the spider waits for passing prey. They rarely leave their burrows, catching prey and withdrawing as quickly as possible. Some of these burrows have a side tubes, but it is not certain whether Sinopesa builds burrows at all.

Genera

, the World Spider Catalog accepts the following genera:

Amblyocarenum Simon, 1892
Brachythele Ausserer, 1871 — Europe, Cyprus
Calisoga Chamberlin, 1937 — United States
Chaco Tullgren, 1905 — Argentina, Uruguay, Chile
Chilelopsis Goloboff, 1995 — Chile
Damarchilus Siliwal, Molur & Raven, 2015
Diplothelopsis Tullgren, 1905 — Argentina
Flamencopsis Goloboff, 1995 — Chile
Gravelyia Mirza & Mondal, 2018 — India
Hermachura Mello-Leitão, 1923 — Brazil
Iberesia Decae & Cardoso, 2006 — Africa, Europe
Longistylus Indicatti & Lucas, 2005 — Brazil
Lycinus Thorell, 1894 — Chile, Argentina, Brazil
Mexentypesa Raven, 1987 — Mexico
Nemesia Audouin, 1826 — Africa, Europe, Cuba, China
Neostothis Vellard, 1925 — Brazil
Prorachias Mello-Leitão, 1924 — Brazil
Psalistopoides Mello-Leitão, 1934 — Brazil
Pselligmus Simon, 1892 — Brazil
Rachias Simon, 1892 — Brazil, Argentina
Raveniola Zonstein, 1987 — Asia
Sinopesa Raven & Schwendinger, 1995 — Asia

Transferred to other families: 

Acanthogonatus Karsch, 1880 → Pycnothelidae
Atmetochilus Simon, 1887 → Bemmeridae
Aname L. Koch, 1873 → Anamidae
Bayana Pérez-Miles, Costa & Montes de Oca, 2014 → Pycnothelidae
Chenistonia Hogg, 1901 → Anamidae
Damarchus Thorell, 1891 → Bemmeridae
Entypesa Simon, 1902 → Entypesidae
Hermacha Simon, 1889 → Entypesidae
Hesperonatalius Castalanelli, Huey, Hillyer & Harvey, 2017 → Anamidae
Ixamatus Simon, 1887 → Microstigmatidae
Kiama Main & Mascord, 1969 → Microstigmatidae
Kwonkan Main, 1983 → Anamidae
Lepthercus Purcell, 1902 → Entypesidae
Namea Raven, 1984 → Anamidae
Pionothele Purcell, 1902 → Pycnothelidae
Proshermacha Simon, 1908 → Anamidae
Pycnothele Chamberlin, 1917 → Pycnothelidae
Spiroctenus Simon, 1889 → Bemmeridae
Stanwellia Rainbow & Pulleine, 1918 → Pycnothelidae
Stenoterommata Holmberg, 1881 → Pycnothelidae
Swolnpes Main & Framenau, 2009 → Anamidae
Teyl Main, 1975 → Anamidae
Teyloides Main, 1985 → Anamidae
Xamiatus Raven, 1981 → Microstigmatidae

Extinct genera 
†Eodiplurina Petrunkevitch 1922 Florissant Formation, United States, Eocene

See also
 List of Nemesiidae species

References

External links

Further reading
 Pesarini, C. (1988): Revision of the genus Pycnothele (Araneae, Nemesiidae). J. Arachnol. 16: 281-293. PDF
 Rafael P. Indicatti & Sylvia M. Lucas (2005): Description of a new genus of Nemesiidae (Araneae, Mygalomorphae) from the Brazilian Cerrado. Zootaxa 1088: 11-16. PDF (Longistylus)
 Indicatti, Rafael P.; Lucas, Sylvia M.; Ott, Ricardo & Brescovit, Antonio D. (2008): Litter dwelling mygalomorph spiders (Araneae: Microstigmatidae, Nemesiidae) from Araucaria forests in southern Brazil, with the description of five new species. Revista Brasileira de Zoologia 25(3): 529-546.
 

 
Mygalomorphae families
Extant Eocene first appearances